The Precision Tech Fergy F-II B is a two-seat side-by-side, conventional landing gear, strut-braced, high-wing, pusher configuration ultralight aircraft that was manufactured by Ferguson Aircraft and later Precision Tech Aircraft in kit form for amateur construction. The aircraft is out of production and no longer available.

Design and development
The Fergy was developed from the Kolb Mark III and introduced to the market in 1991. Reviewer Andre Cliche describes it as a "clone", whilst Noel Bertrand et al. claim it was "inspired by the Kolb Twinstar". The aircraft differs from the Kolb design in that it has a revised cockpit pod, with centerline-hinged doors and a square-tipped rudder. The horizontal stabilizer was also raised a few inches to give better ground clearance.

The aircraft is constructed from aluminium tubing, covered with aircraft fabric. The wings fold for storage or trailering.

The average construction time from the kit was reported by the manufacturer as 350 hours and 40 had been completed by 2001.

Operational history
The Fergie won the Grand Champion title at Sun 'n Fun in 1991.

Specifications (Precision Tech Fergy)

See also

References

1990s United States ultralight aircraft
Homebuilt aircraft